William Ætheling (5 August 1103 – 25 November 1120), commonly called Adelin  (sometimes Adelinus, Adelingus, A(u)delin or other Latinised Norman-French variants of Ætheling) was the son of Henry I of England by his wife Matilda of Scotland, and was thus heir apparent to the English throne. His early death without issue caused a succession crisis, known in history as the Anarchy.

Early life
William was born in Winchester. His father, King Henry I of England, had married his mother, Matilda of Scotland, to conciliate his English subjects. Matilda was descended from Edmund Ironside and was a great-niece of Edward the Confessor; as such, the marriage represented a union between the new Norman rulers of England and the old Anglo-Saxon dynasty.

Henry's hopes for his succession rested upon William, who was, according to Henry of Huntingdon, "a prince so pampered" that he seemed "destined to be food for the fire."

Duke of Normandy
During Henry I's lifetime, William was invested as Duke of Normandy, a title he held more in name than in practice.  Henry made the investiture when he was pressed by the king of France, Louis VI, to do homage as Duke of Normandy.  As a king in his own right, Henry was loath to comply, and in 1115 he offered to have William do this in his stead.  This offer was eventually accepted in 1120, after an intervening period of war, and William did homage to Louis VI in the middle of 1120.  For this reason William is sometimes counted as Duke of Normandy (as either William III or William IV). William received, as the heir to the throne, the homage and fealty of the barons of Normandy in 1115 and of the barons of England in March 1116.

William's mother Queen Matilda served as Henry's regent in England while he was away in Normandy.  After her death in 1118 William was old enough to serve in her stead.  He was closely advised in this role by the King's administrators, such as Roger of Salisbury.  During the last year or so of his life he was sometimes referred to as rex designatus (king designate).

During his 35-year reign Henry I of England faced several eruptions of hostilities due to the alliances of rival regions with some of his neighbours.  To secure the loyalty of Anjou, a long-time rival of Normandy, Henry betrothed William to Matilda of Anjou, eldest daughter of Count Fulk V of Anjou in February 1113 near Alençon. Their marriage took place in June 1119 in Lisieux.

Death

William died in the White Ship tragedy of 25 November 1120. The Duke and his companions had been crossing the English Channel from Barfleur in the Blanche-Nef, the swiftest and most modern ship in the royal fleet. William and his party had remained drinking on the shore until after dark, confident that in a fast ship and on the still sea the delay would have no real effect. Consequently, it was the middle of the night when the drunken helmsman rammed the ship into a rock in the bay.

The crew and passengers could not lever the ship off the rock, or prevent the ship from filling with water. William and several of his friends managed to launch a life-dinghy. At the last minute, William dashed back to rescue his illegitimate half-sister, Matilda FitzRoy, Countess of Perche. When they and several others threw themselves into the small dinghy, it, "overcharged by the multitude that leapt into her, capsized and sank and buried all indiscriminately in the deep."

Henry of Huntingdon, speaking of the disaster, wrote that William, "instead of wearing embroidered robes…floated naked in the waves, and instead of ascending a lofty throne…found his grave at the bottom of the sea." William's wife, Matilda, was on another ship at the time of the wreck. William's death left the succession to his father uncertain. After King Henry died in 1135, William's sister Empress Matilda and cousin Stephen of Blois waged long a war for the English throne in what is known as The Anarchy.

Notes

References

Hollister, C. Warren. Henry I (Yale Monarchs Series) 
Meade, Marion,  Eleanor of Aquitaine 

1103 births
1120 deaths
12th-century Dukes of Normandy
Heirs to the English throne
Dukes of Normandy
English people of French descent
English people of Scottish descent
12th-century English people
William
Heirs apparent who never acceded
People from Winchester
Deaths on the White Ship
Children of Henry I of England
Anglo-Normans
Sons of kings